Echo is a sculpture by Jaume Plensa, created in 2011, and installed at Seattle's Olympic Sculpture Park, in the U.S. state of Washington. It was modelled after a neighborhood girl; her face was then elongated to distort her features into the form the statue is now.

References

External links

 Echo at Seattle Art Museum

2011 sculptures
Olympic Sculpture Park
Sculptures by Jaume Plensa